The 1908–09 Sheffield Shield season was the 17th season of the Sheffield Shield, the domestic first-class cricket competition of Australia. New South Wales won the championship.

Table

Statistics

Most Runs
Vernon Ransford 720

Most Wickets
Jack O'Connor 26

References

Sheffield Shield
Sheffield Shield
Sheffield Shield seasons